This list of Swedish saints includes all Christian saints with connections to Sweden, either because they were of Swedish origin and ethnicity or because they travelled to the Swedish people from their own homeland and became noted in their hagiography for their work. A few may have had no Swedish connection in their lifetime, but have nonetheless become associated with Sweden through the depositing of their relics in Swedish religious houses in the Middle Ages.

Like many European nations, a number of saints were connected to the Royal Family but, unusually, many Swedish saints were women.

See also 
 List of Swedish clergymen
 List of Swedish people
 Name days in Sweden
 List of saints of the Canary Islands
 List of Scandinavian saints

Christian saints of the Middle Ages
Sweden
saints
 
Catholic Church in Sweden
Saints
Saints